Caesium azide or cesium azide is an inorganic compound of caesium and nitrogen. It is a salt of azide with the formula .

Structure
When heated to 151°C, it transitions to a cubic structure.

Preparation and reactions
Caesium azide can be prepared from the neutralization reaction between hydrazoic acid and caesium hydroxide:

Caesium carbonate can also be used as the base:

Caesium sulfate reacts with barium azide to form insoluble barium sulfate and caesium azide:

References

Azides
Caesium compounds